Anth is a 1994 Indian action film directed by Sanjay Khanna, produced by Ashok Honda and starred Sunil Shetty, Somy Ali in pivotal roles. Aloknath, Paresh Rawal, Mohan Joshi, Deepak Shirke, Vijayendra Ghatge, Neena Gupta, Makrand Deshpande also featured in the film.

Plot

Kali is a local ruffian who harasses students in his college. The principal Satyaprakash is helpless to stop him because Kali is the son of Dabla, who is one of the biggest gangsters in town. Satyaprakash has two sons Vikas and Vijay Saxena and a daughter Pooja. Vijay Saxena is in the love with Priya, a colleague in his engineering company.

Kali rapes Pooja, and then the corrupt inspector Shirke puts the blame on Pooja's fiancée and has him killed while in custody. This enrages Vijay and he embarks upon a bloody and violent fight to cleanse the city of ruffians like Kali, Dabla and Shirke. ACP Kulkarni shows up in a special appearance as an honest ACP.

Cast
Suniel Shetty as Vijay Saxena 
Somy Ali as Priya 
Aloknath as Principal Satyaprakash Saxena
Paresh Rawal as Dabla 
Deepak Shirke as Inspector Shirke 
Rita Bhaduri as Priya's Mother
Makrand Deshpande as Kali 
Vijayendra Ghatge as Advocate Vikas Saxena 
Neena Gupta as Mrs. Vikas Saxena
Mohan Joshi as ACP Kulkarni
Vinay Sapru as Raja

Soundtrack

The music was composed by Anand–Milind, while Sameer wrote the lyrics.

References

External links
 

1994 films
1994 action films
Indian action films
1990s Hindi-language films
Films scored by Anand–Milind
Hindi-language action films